The 1992–93 Xavier Musketeers men's basketball team represented Xavier University from Cincinnati, Ohio in the 1992–93 season. Led by head coach Pete Gillen, the Musketeers finished with a 24–6 record (12–2 MCC), won the MCC regular season title, and received an at-large bid to the NCAA tournament as the No. 9 seed in the Midwest region. In the NCAA tournament, the Musketeers defeated No. 8 seed New Orleans, then lost to No. 1 seed Indiana in the second round.

Roster

Schedule and results

|-
!colspan=9 style=| Regular Season

|-
!colspan=9 style=| Midwestern Collegiate Conference Tournament

|-
!colspan=9 style=| NCAA Tournament

Rankings

References

Xavier
Xavier Musketeers men's basketball seasons
Xavier